Dirceu Inácio da Silva Júnior (born 29 January 1989), known as just Dirceu, is a Brazilian footballer.

Career

Club
Dirceu started his career with Palmeiras youth side.

On 29 March 2011 he signed a half-year contract with Korona Kielce. He made his debut on 10 April 2011 in a 2–2 draw against Wisła Kraków. He was released at the end of the season.

References

External links
 

1989 births
Brazilian footballers
Association football defenders
Living people
Korona Kielce players
Ekstraklasa players
Brazilian expatriate footballers
Expatriate footballers in Poland
Brazilian expatriate sportspeople in Poland